The Plymouth shooting occurred in Keyham, Plymouth, Devon, England, United Kingdom, on 12 August 2021. The gunman, 22-year-old Jake Davison, shot and killed five people and injured two others before fatally shooting himself. Devon and Cornwall Police have not identified a motive.

The Home Office announced that it would issue updated guidelines for firearms licence applications. 

In February 2023, the inquest jury returned a verdict of unlawful killing of all of the victims.

Background
In the United Kingdom either a firearms certificate (FAC) or a shotgun certificate (SGC) is a legal requirement to own most classes of permitted firearms. In Great Britain  certificates are granted by the local policing authority. For both certificates the applicant must demonstrate a good reason for owning the particular firearm and undergo a background check. A SGC also requires certified secure storage.

Shooting 

At 18:05 BST (UTC+1) on 12 August 2021, during a physical altercation, victim Maxine Davison, perpetrator Jake Davison's 51-year-old mother, contacted her sister regarding the argument. Subsequently, her sister dialed 999, telling the operator her sister's son had "mental health issues", had grabbed her by the throat and would not let her out of a bedroom.

Between 18:05 and 18:08, Davison opened fire with a legally-owned pump-action shotgun, killing his mother inside her house on Biddick Drive, a residential street in the Keyham area of Plymouth. He then left the house, shotgun in hand, and witnesses describe Davison firing upon a 3-year-old girl and her 43-year-old father in the street, killing them both. Next, he injured a 53-year-old woman and her 33-year-old son in a house on Biddick Drive, before shooting and killing a 59-year-old man in a nearby park. At 18:11, Devon and Cornwall Police received reports of shots having been fired in multiple locations.

Davison then went to Henderson Place, where he shot and fatally wounded a 66-year-old woman; he told a passing resident that there was "nothing to worry about, mate". Shortly before killing himself, Davison was described as "walking like [he] was on patrol, like a soldier with a gun" and with a "blank expression". At 18:23, Davison shot himself on Henderson Place.

Emergency response 

Devon and Cornwall Police and the South Western Ambulance Service were alerted to the incident at 18:11 and 18:12, respectively. The ambulance service responded with a significant number of resources, including hazardous area response teams, ambulances, specialist paramedics, and air ambulances. Devon and Cornwall Police stated that officers attended the scene within six minutes of the emergency calls and found the bodies of Davison and four of the victims. They described the events as a "serious firearms incident" and established thirteen different crime scenes within the cordoned area.

The 66-year-old female victim was treated at Henderson Place for gunshot wounds but later died in Derriford Hospital. The two survivors received significant but non-life-threatening injuries. At 21:25, the police reported they believed the incident to be contained.

Perpetrator 
The gunman was named by police as Jake Davison, a 22-year-old from Plymouth who worked as an apprentice crane operator at security and defence company Babcock International. 

Davison was diagnosed with autism and ADHD as a child and attended Mount Tamar school for special needs children. In Year 9 of secondary education, his review with Careers South West (CSW), a mental health guidance counselling organisation, stated that "He [Davison] loves guns and he wants to join a gun club. Much of the review was taken up talking about how to get involved with guns […] we suggested Army cadets". Karen Roberts from CSW said Davison's mother had called them in November 2016, saying she was worried about her son as he was isolated and obsessed with weapons. Roberts met Davison on 7 December 2016 to talk about his career prospects and he told her his "real passion" was firearms and he wanted to work in a firearms shop. She said she raised concerns with her manager that a Prevent referral might need to be made, however, this never occurred as there was "no evidence he was talking to people who could take advantage of him".

He was a regular visitor to Shetland, where he spent long periods of time with his mother's relatives, including his two older siblings; it was there that initial concerns were raised about his mental state. In 2016, Davison was reported to the police for allegedly attacking a man and his pregnant girlfriend not far from where the shooting would occur; Davison was warned by police but not prosecuted. A close source to the family said that Davison had recently deteriorated after suffering from mental health problems for most of his life, and that his mother was "begging for help from the authorities but nobody did a welfare check". During the UK's COVID-19 lockdowns in the eighteen months before the shooting, Davison had accessed a local mental health support charity.

Davison applied for a shotgun certificate in July 2017, in which he declared autism and Asperger syndrome on the form and gave officers permission to contact his GP. He had been licensed to own a firearm since 2018, and police believe he used a legally-held firearm in the shooting. Police had removed his shotgun and licence in December 2020 following an assault allegation described as "a row with two youths", but the weapons were returned in early July 2021, a month before the killings. This was through the force’s ‘Pathfinder’ scheme, a deferred caution and deferred charge scheme designed to deal with offenders outside of the criminal justice process. Following Devon and Cornwall Police's self-referral to the Independent Office for Police Conduct (IOPC), the agency investigated the service's previous dealings with Davison, its decision to grant him a firearms licence and the decision to reinstate the licence, and the decision to return his gun after it was temporarily revoked.

Lifestyle, misogynistic and incel-related views
Davison uploaded videos to YouTube under the name "Professor Waffle". His videos included references to "inceldom", the black pill worldview and general nihilism. In his last video, Davison described himself as "beaten down and defeated by life" and said: "I wouldn't clarify  myself as an incel but have talked to people similar to me who have had nothing but themselves."

Davison expressed misogynist and homophobic views, and used Reddit to share hostility and resentment towards his mother, who had repeatedly attempted to obtain – and persuade him to receive – treatment for his mental health. On Reddit, he subscribed to incel-related content, and other clips of his videos contained further references to, and used terminology of, that community. In one clip, Davison discussed "missing out on a teenage romance" and referred to "Chads", slang for confident, sexually active men. He said he had considered using drugs to "make up for that missed teenage experience" and that, "I have a feeling like I missed that boat and it's never coming back".

Davison was also active in gun enthusiast subreddits. Reddit suspended his account a day before the shooting for making inappropriate comments to a 16-year-old female American Reddit user. He had initially been friendly with the girl and had discussed having a relationship with her, before the conversation soured and he began to repeatedly ask to have sex with her. According to the report, the girl complained that he had repeatedly asked her to date him, travel to see him, and have sex with him, and had made comments about how sex with someone of her age is acceptable because it was legal in the UK. Various users urged her to report Davison to the police, but she wrote that she did not know what to do and had been advised by her mother not to get involved. 

Davison became interested in weightlifting and bodybuilding during the final year of his life; his belongings had 'taken over the house' with him having a bedroom, a computer room and had set up his gym equipment in the lounge. Mr Wood, who was in a relationship with Davison's mother from July 2020 and lived with her in Biddick Drive between August and November 2020, before moving out, said that he had seen Davison using steroids, would also "drink 12 energy drinks a day" and would ingest protein supplements as part of his weight-training regime.

Davison's mother had begun to argue with her son over his sexist views and diatribes on women in the months before the shooting. A neighbour said Davison and his mother "used to be close [...] but then his views changed and he went against women and he became a misogynist [...] they clashed a lot about that." Davison had a physical confrontation with his father shortly before the shooting.

Aftermath 

Davison's Facebook and YouTube accounts were terminated in line with the sites' behavioural policies.

In February 2022 Davison's father Mark was interviewed for the BBC and said he was sorry and ashamed of his son's actions. He said that he had told police, in 2017, that he did not think his son should be allowed a shotgun.

Vigil and condolences 
An evening vigil was held on 13 August at North Down Crescent Park in Keyham. Flags in the city were flown at half-mast, and Smeaton's Tower was lit up that evening as a mark of respect. 

Books of condolence were made available in several locations, along with an online book on the Plymouth City Council's website. Several memorials were placed at areas close to the crime scenes, where flowers and cards were laid, as well as further impromptu vigils being held by residents.

Inquest 
On 19 August 2021, the inquest into the deaths of Davison and his five victims was opened in Plymouth. On 20 February 2023 the jury returned a verdict of unlawful killing of all of the victims. Ian Arrow, the senior coroner for Plymouth said that "There was a serious failure by Devon and Cornwall Police's firearms and explosive licensing unit in granting and later failing to revoke the perpetrator's shotgun licence." He also called for reform of the UK's gun laws, saying that shotguns were "no less lethal" than other types of firearm.

Police investigation and disciplinary action
The chief constable of Devon and Cornwall Police, Shaun Sawyer, said that Davison's motive was unknown, but that police believed the shooting was a "domestic incident [that] spilled into the streets". He stated that police were not considering terrorism as a motive, although commentators have questioned whether Davison's ideologies would constitute terrorism.

The investigation, codenamed Operation Lillypad, was led by Detective Inspector Steve Hambly. Hambly said that Davison's mother was the only victim known to the attacker. The IOPC investigated why Davison had a shotgun licence despite concerns around his mental health, and the senior coroner asked the office to examine the case of Michael Atherton who in 2012 killed his partner, her sister, her niece and himself, having had a history of domestic abuse and self-harm threats.

On 6 October 2021, the IOPC issued disciplinary notices to two members of Devon and Cornwall Police over their handling of Davison's certificate for his shotgun, which he used for clay pigeon shooting.

Firearm licensing

On 15 August 2021, the British government announced that it would issue guidance to require police to investigate social media posts of firearms licence applicants and current holders. Before the new guidance is published, the Home Office asked all police services in England and Wales immediately "to review their practices and whether any existing licences need to be looked at again".

See also 
 List of mass shootings in the United Kingdom

Notes

References

2021 in England
2021 mass shootings in Europe
2021 murders in the United Kingdom
2020s in Devon
2020s mass shootings in the United Kingdom
Shooting
21st-century mass murder in the United Kingdom
Attacks in the United Kingdom in 2021
August 2021 crimes in Europe
August 2021 events in the United Kingdom
Crime in Devon
Deaths by firearm in England
Incidents of domestic violence
Mass murder in 2021
Mass murder in England
Mass shootings in England
Matricides
Murder–suicides in the United Kingdom